The Beguines and the Beghards were Christian lay religious orders that were active in Western Europe, particularly in the Low Countries, in the 13th–16th centuries. Their members lived in semi-monastic communities but did not take formal religious vows; although they promised not to marry "as long as they lived as Beguines," to quote one of the early Rules, they were free to leave at any time. Beguines were part of a larger spiritual revival movement of the 13th century that stressed imitation of Jesus' life through voluntary poverty, care of the poor and sick, and religious devotion.

Etymology
The term "Beguine"  is of uncertain origin and may have been pejorative. Scholars no longer credit the theory expounded in the Encyclopædia Britannica Eleventh Edition (1911) that the name derived from Lambert le Bègue, a priest of Liège. Other theories, such as derivation from the name of St. Begga and from the purported, reconstructed Old Saxon word , "to beg" or "to pray", have also been discredited. The origin of the movement's name continues to be uncertain, as are the dates for the beginning of the movement itself.

There is likewise no evidence that Beguines ever formed part of the Cathar heretical groups. Encyclopedias, when they mention this latter explanation at all, tend to dismiss it.

Beguines (laywomen)

Communities and status

At the beginning of the 12th century, some women in the Low Countries lived alone and devoted themselves to prayer and good works without taking vows. At first there were only a few, but in the course of the century, their numbers increased. In the Middle Ages there were more women than men due to the structure of urban demographics and marriage patterns in the Low Countries. These women lived in towns, where they attended to the poor. During the 13th century, some of them bought homes that neighbored each other. These small communities of women soon attracted the attention of secular and clerical authorities. Moved or inspired by the women's commitment to prayer, the sacraments, and charitable service in the world, local clergy sought to channel and deploy the women's spiritual fame in response to contemporary problems, especially the institutional church's war on heresy. Several clerics sought to promote these mulieres religiosae (or religious women) as saints after their deaths. Probably the most famous instance of this was the relationship between James of Vitry and Marie d'Oignies, who is sometimes referred to as the prototypical Beguine. Marie d'Oignies inspired James. She encouraged and improved his preaching and many of her miracles served to promote the sacramental program of Lateran IV. After Marie's death, James traveled to Rome on behalf of the "religious women" in the diocese of Liège, seeking papal permission for the women to live in common and incite one another to live good Christian lives.

Beguines were not nuns, but they are sometimes conflated with nuns. Beguines took personal, informal vows of chastity. Animated by the ideals of the vita apostolica—the same ideals that led to the formation of the mendicant orders—Beguines pursued a life of contemplative prayer and active service in the world. As women, Beguines were forbidden to preach and teach, yet they actively exhorted their fellow Christians to live lives of penance, service, and prayer.

Beguines were never recognized as an official, papally approved religious order. They did not follow an approved rule, they did not live in convents, and they did not give up their personal property. In fact, Beguines were free to abandon their religious vocation at any time since it was not enforced by any binding monastic vow. In many cases, the term "Beguine" referred to a woman who wore humble garb and stood apart as living a religious life above and beyond the practice of ordinary laypeople.

In cities such as Cambrai, Valenciennes, and Liège, local officials established formal communities for these women that became known as beguinages. Beguinages (Begijnhoven in Dutch-speaking areas) tended to be located near or within town centers and were often close to the rivers that provided water for their work in the cloth industry.

While some women joined communities of like-minded lay religious women, adopting the label "Beguine" by virtue of entering a beguinage, many women lived alone or with one or two other like-minded women. Beguines engaged in a range of occupations to support themselves. Women in the Low Countries tended to work in the cities' lucrative wool industry. Parisian Beguines were important contributors to the city's burgeoning silk industry.

Beguinages were not convents. There was no overarching structure such as a mother-house. Each beguinage adopted its own rule. The Bishop of Liège created a rule for Beguines in his diocese. However, every community was complete in itself and fixed its own order of living. Later, many adopted the rule of the Third Order of Saint Francis.

Beguine communities varied in terms of the social status of their members; some of them only admitted ladies of high degree; others were reserved exclusively for persons in humble circumstances; others still welcomed women of every condition, and these were the most popular. Several, like the great beguinage of Ghent, had thousands of inhabitants. The Beguinage of Paris, founded before 1264, housed as many as 400 women. Douceline of Digne founded the Beguine movement in Marseille; her hagiography, which was composed by a member of her community, sheds light on the movement in general.

This semi-monastic institution was adapted to its age and spread rapidly throughout the land. Some Beguines became known as "holy women", and their devotions influenced religious life within the region. Beguine religious life was part of the mysticism of that age. There was a beguinage at Mechelen as early as 1207, at Brussels in 1245, at Leuven before 1232, at Antwerp in 1234, and at Bruges in 1244. By the close of the century, most communes in the Low Countries had a beguinage; several of the great cities had two or more.

Some influential Beguinages were Begijnhof (Amsterdam), Begijnhof (Breda), Begijnhof (Utrecht).

Criticism and social response 
As the 13th century progressed, some Beguines came under criticism as a result of their ambiguous social and legal status. As a conscious choice to live in the world but in a way that effectively surpassed (at least in piety) or stood out from most laypeople, Beguines attracted disapprobation as much as admiration. In some regions, the term Beguine itself denoted an ostentatiously, even obnoxiously religious woman; an image that quickly led to accusations of hypocrisy (consider the Beguine known as "Constrained Abstinence" in the ). Some professed religious were offended by the assuming of "religious" status without the commitment to a rule, while the laity resented the implicit disapproval of marriage and other markers of secular life. The women's legal standing in relation to ecclesiastical and lay authorities was unclear. Beguines seemed to enjoy the best of both worlds: holding on to their property and living in the world as laypeople while claiming the privileges and protections of the professed religious.

On the other hand, admirers such as the secular cleric Robert de Sorbon ( 1274) noted that Beguines exhibited far more devotion to God than even the cloistered, since they voluntarily pursued a religious life without vows and walls, surrounded by the world's temptations.

The power of the Beguine label is evident in the "watershed" moments of Beguine history, from its first appearance in the sermons of James of Vitry (the Beguine movement's earliest and perhaps most famous promoter), to its reference in the trial of the doomed mystic Marguerite Porete (who was burned at the stake in Paris on charges of heresy in 1310), to its centrality in the condemnation of lay religious women at the Council of Vienne in 1311–1312.

Marguerite Porete 
Sometime during the early to mid-1290s, Marguerite Porete wrote a mystical book known as The Mirror of Simple Souls. Written in Old French, the book describes the annihilation of the soul, specifically its descent into a state of nothingness—of union with God without distinction. While clearly popular throughout the Middle Ages and beyond (perhaps dozens of copies circulated throughout late-medieval western Europe) the book provoked some controversy, likely because of statements such as "a soul annihilated in the love of the creator could, and should, grant to nature all that it desires," which some took to mean that a soul can become one with God and that when in this state it can ignore moral law, as it had no need for the Church and its sacraments, or its code of virtues. This was not what Porete taught, since she explained that souls in such a state desired only good and would not be able to sin. Nevertheless, the book's teachings, for some, were too easily misconstrued, particularly by the unlearned.

Also at issue was the manner in which Porete disseminated her teachings, which was evocative of actions and behaviors some clerics were finding increasingly problematic among lay religious women in that era. Indeed, Porete was eventually tried by the Dominican inquisitor of France and burned at the stake as a relapsed heretic in 1310. In 1311—the year after Porete's death—ecclesiastical officials made several specific connections between Porete's ideas and deeds and the Beguine status in general at the Council of Vienne. One of the council's decrees, claimed that Beguines "dispute and preach about the highest Trinity and the divine essence and introduce opinions contrary to the catholic faith concerning the articles of the faith and the sacraments of the church."

Post-1312 decline 
After the Council of Vienne in 1312, the Beguines declined. By the 14th century, some communities were absorbed by monastic and mendicant orders. Many, however, survived the aftermath of the Vienne decrees.

Most of these institutions were suppressed during the Reformation of the 16th century or during the stormy years of revolutions and social unrest of the French Revolution. A few béguinages persisted until the early 20th century in parts of Belgium, including those of Bruges, Lier, Mechelen, Leuven and Ghent, which last numbered nearly a thousand members in 1905.

Surviving Beguines
The community of Begijnhof, Amsterdam, credited with having considerably influenced the development of what was the city's southern edge in the late Middle Ages, survived the Protestant Reformation staunchly Catholic. Their parish church was confiscated and given over to exiled English Puritans. The last Amsterdam Beguine died in 1971, but the Begijnhof remains one of the city's best-known landmarks.

Marcella Pattyn, the last traditional Beguine, died on 14 April 2013 in Kortrijk at the age of 92. Born in the Belgian Congo in 1920, she was accepted into the Holy Corner of Elizabeth of Hungary at Sint-Amandsberg, Ghent, in 1941 and moved to the Béguinage of St Elisabeth at Kortrijk in 1960, where she became one of a community of nine.

Second and third waves
Writer Jean Hughes Raber, a student of medieval women's movements, posited a second wave of the Beguine movement, which occurred in the 17th century, when it was supported by Archbishop Mathias Hovius. His involvement included helping improve the Great Beguines at Mechelen. Raber says there was no clear end to the Second Movement. She suggests that Catholic lay movements, such as those of Dorothy Day in the United States, the Company of St. Ursula and communities of women initiated by Francisca Hernandez, can be seen as extensions of the Beguines into the 20th century.

Raber suggests the Beguines' response to social and economic forces in the 12th century offers a model that can meet current conditions: economic uncertainty or worse, single women comprising a larger section of the population, and loss of wealth in the form of deflated values of housing. She cites a California-based group, the American Beguines, as an example of the revival of the Beguine Movement, with notable but not necessarily problematic differences. In recent decades, a new Beguine movement has arisen in Germany.

Recently, the Beguines of Mercy were founded in Vancouver, British Columbia, Canada. It is a contemplative third order of educated Catholic women whose roots are in spiritual community. Their affiliations are good works, quiet contemplation, and living out their spiritual values.

Notable Beguines
Among Beguines who have become well-known representatives of the movement in contemporary literature are: Christina von Stommeln, Douceline of Digne, Hadewijch, Marguerite Porete, Marie d'Oignies, and Mechthild of Magdeburg. Modern Beguines include Marcella Pattyn, and perhaps Dorothy Day.

Beghards (laymen)
A widespread religious revival inspired several societies for men which were kindred to the Beguines. Of these, the Beghards were the most numerous and the most important.

Membership
The Beghards were all laymen and, like the Beguines, they were not bound by vows, the rule of life which they observed was not uniform, and the members of each community were subject only to their own local superiors. They held no private property; the brethren of each cloister had a common purse, dwelt together under one roof and ate at the same board. They were for the most part men of humble origin—like weavers, dyers, and fullers—who were closely connected with the city craft-guilds. For example, no man could be admitted to the Beghards' community at Brussels unless he were a member of the Weavers' Company. The Beghards were often men to whom fortune had not been kind—men who had outlived their friends, or whose family ties had been broken by some untoward event and who, by reason of failing health or advancing years, or perhaps on account of some accident, were unable to stand alone. If "the medieval towns of the Netherlands found in the Beguinage a solution of their feminine question", the growth of the Beghard communities provided a place for the worn-out working man.

The men had banded together in the first place to build up the inner man. While working out their own salvation, they remained mindful of their neighbors and, thanks to their connection with the craft-guilds, they influenced the religious life. They are credited with shaping the religious opinion of the cities and towns of the Netherlands for more than 200 years, especially for the peasant.

Relation to the Church
Religious authorities believed the Beguines had heretical tendencies and sometimes tried to bring disciplinary measures against them. The Synods of Fritzlar (1259), Mainz (1261), and Eichstätt (1282) brought measures against them and they were forbidden as "having no approbation" by the Synod of Béziers (1299). They were condemned by the Council of Vienne (1312), but this sentence was mitigated by Pope John XXII (1321), who permitted the Beguines to resume their mode of life after reform.

The Beghards were more obstinate; during the 14th century, they were repeatedly condemned by the Holy See, the bishops (notably in Germany) and the Inquisition. The Catholic Encyclopedia acknowledges that men of faith and piety were found among the Beghards. In their behalf, Pope Gregory XI (1374–77) and Pope Boniface IX (1394) addressed Bulls to the bishops of Germany and the Netherlands. The doctrine of Quietism is believed to resemble the stance of these community members.

Modern decline
Before the close of the Middle Ages, Beghard communities were in decline. Their numbers diminished with the waning of the textile trade and, when that industry died, gradually dwindled away. The highest number of such medieval foundations in Flanders and Wallonia was 94, but in 1734 they had been reduced to just 34 and in 1856 to 20.

Literary references
Joyce Hollyday's 2020 novel Pillar of Fire offers a well-researched fictionalized account of Beguines based in part on the writing of Marguerite Porete. 
In his multi-volume novel The Life and Opinions of Tristram Shandy, Gentleman (1759–1767), Laurence Sterne has his character Corporal Trim describe a Beguine.
In Charlotte Brontë's 1853 novel Villette, Beguines and a beguinage are mentioned in Chapter 17, "La Terrasse".
The title is the name of the street where Tamara, a courtesan, lives apart from the bourgeois society of Gers, a fictional Flemish town.
In Umberto Eco's 1980 novel The Name of the Rose (1983 in English), the Beghards are frequently mentioned among the heretical movements which the Inquisition is persecuting.
Bernard Cornwell in his 2003 novel Heretic has a character, Genevieve, who is a condemned Beguine heretic rescued by the main character, Thomas of Hookton.
Karen Maitland in her 2009 novel The Owl Killers portrays a group of Beguines in the fictional early 14th-century English village of Ulewic.
Ken Follett in his 2012 novel World Without End mentions the life of Beguines in the Netherlands.
Helga Gielen in her 2019 virtual tour in the Grand Beguinage of Leuven explains the difference between Beguines and nuns.

See also

Brethren of the Common Life
Christian anarchism
Christian mysticism
Hadewijch
Heresy of the Free Spirit
Mechthild of Magdeburg
Nicholas of Basel
Sister Catherine Treatise

References

Bibliography
 Burnham, Louisa A., So Great a Light, So Great a Smoke. The Beguin Heretics of Languedoc, Cornell University Press, 2008.
 De Cant, Geneviève, Majérus Pascal & Verougstraete Christiane, A World of Independent Women: From the 12th Century to the Present Day: the Flemish Beguinages, Riverside: Hervé van Caloen Foundation, 2003.
 Deane, Jennifer Kolpacoff, Beguines' Reconsidered: Historiographical Problems and New Directions, Monastic Matrix, 2008.
Simons, Walter, Cities of Ladies: Beguine Communities in the Medieval Low Countries, 1200-1565, Philadelphia: University of Philadelphia Press, 2001.
 McDonnell, Ernest W., The Beguines and Beghards in Medieval Culture: With Special Emphasis on the Belgian Scene, New York: Octagon Books, 1969 (1954 edition online at HathiTrust).
 Miller, Tanya Stabler, The Beguines of Medieval Paris: Gender, Patronage, and Spiritual Authority, Philadelphia, University of Pennsylvania Press, 2014
 Murk-Jansen, Saskia, Brides in the Desert: The Spirituality of the Beguine, Maryknoll, NY: Orbis Books, 1998
 Neel, Carol, The Origins of the Beguines, Signs, 1989.
 Petroff, Elizabeth Alvilda, Body and Soul: Essays on Medieval Women and Mysticism, Oxford: Oxford University Press, 1994
 Philippen, L.J.M., "De Begijnhoven:  Oorsprong, Geschiedenis, Inrichting. Antwerp, Belgium: Ch. and H. Courtin, 1918.
 Reichstein, Frank-Michael, Das Beginenwesen in Deutschland, 2. Auflage,  Berlin, 2017.
 Simons, Walter, Staining the Speech of Things Divine: The Uses of Literacy in Medieval Beguine Communities, Thérèse De Hemptinne & Maria Eugenia Gongora (eds.), The Voice of Silence: Women's Literacy in a Men's Church, Turnhout, Brepols, 2004.
 Swan, Laura, The Wisdom of the Beguines: the Forgotten Story of a Medieval Women's Movement, BlueBridge, 2014.
 Van Aerschot Suzanne & Heirman Michiel, Les béguinages de Flandre. Un patrimoine mondial, Brussels: éditions Racine, 2001.
 Von Der Osten-Sacken, Vera, Jakob von Vitrys Vita Mariae Oigniacensis. Zu Herkunft und Eigenart der ersten Beginen, Göttingen: Vandenhoeck & Ruprecht, 2010 (=VIEG 223).

Sources

External links
Chambers, Ephraim. Cyclopædia, 1728, Beguines p. 95
CATHOLIC ENCYCLOPEDIA: Beguines, Beghards
Marygrace Peter's article on Beguines
Articles exploring Beguines, their spirituality and current relevance.
 Jennifer Kolpacoff Deane, "'Beguines' Reconsidered: Historiographical Problems and New Directions" Monastic Matrix (2008)
 Beguine Communities and Medieval History: An Unexpected Treasure?

 World Religions and Spirituality: History of the beguines from the thirteenth century to the present by Tanya Stabler Miller 

 
Christian religious orders established in the 12th century
Christian mystics